Donald Sanford may refer to:

 Donald Sanford (athlete) (born 1987), Israeli sprinter of American descent
 Donald S. Sanford (1918–2011), American television, radio and film screenwriter